Lord Saltoun and Auchanachie (Child 239, Roud 102), is a Scottish folk song.

Synopsis 

Its heroine, Jeannie, is to be married off at the insistence of her father to a wealthy man, Lord Saltoun, but she is in love with Annachie Gordon, the subject of the song.  The song chronicles her resistance to the marriage before she is eventually dragged to the church.  Jeannie refuses to sleep in the same bed until her father comes down and tells her maidens to undo her gown.  Jeannie collapses at her father's feet and dies for love of Annachie. Annachie, having been away at sea, returns where Jeannie's distressed maidens tell him that Jeannie has been married in his absence and has now died of a broken heart.  Annachie tells the maidens to take him to the chamber where Jeannie lies and then, having kissed her cold lips, also dies of a broken heart.

Versions 

The words were printed in Maidment's "North Countrie Garland" (1824) and in Buchan's "Ancient Ballads and Songs 2" (1828). The tune was first printed in Bronson's "Traditional Tunes of the Child Ballads". The story features a classic version of star crossed lovers (most often associated with "Romeo and Juliet"), with the two dying at the end. Sometime between 1800 and 1829 a broadsheet ballad called "A New Song" was printed. In it the name "Auchanachie Gordon" has been replaced by "Hannah Le Gordon" but is otherwise very similar. It is hard to explain why the hero has been given a girl's name. Perhaps the Scots name was so unfamiliar to the Newcastle printer than he made a somewhat garbled choice of name.

Nic Jones recorded his version of the song as Annachie Gordon on his 1977 album The Noah's Ark Trap (1977). Mary Black included it using the same name on the album Mary Black. Loreena McKennitt recorded it on Parallel Dreams (1989). Other versions include June Tabor's on Always (2005),  Sharon Shannon's on Libertango (2004), John Wesley Harding's on Trad Arr Jones (1999) and Oliver Schroer's instrumental version on Celtic Devotion (1999). Sinéad O'Connor also recorded a version on the Sharon Shannon Collection released in 2005, and Gabrielle Angelique recorded the song on her album Dance with the Stars (2006).  The Unthanks 2009 album Here's the Tender Coming also contains a version.  In the 1930s, Alan Lomax recorded Aunt Molly Jackson singing an American version she called "Archie D," which is believed to be one of the earliest field recordings of this song in existence.

Traditional Lyrics 
"Auchanachie Gordon is bonny and braw,
He would tempt any woman that he ever saw;
He would tempt any woman, so has he tempted me,
And I'll die if I getna my love Auchanachie."

In came her father, tripping on the floor,
Says, "Jeanie, ye're trying the tricks o' a whore;
Ye're caring for them that cares little for thee;
Ye must marry Salton, leave Auchanachie.

"Auchanachie Gordon, he is but a man;
Altho' he be pretty, where lies his free land?
Salton's lands they lie broad, his towers they stand hie,
Ye must marry Salton, leave Auchanachie.

......
......
"Salton will gar you wear silk gowns fring'd to thy knee,
But ye'll never wear that wi' your love Auchanachie."

"Wi' Auchanachie Gordon I would beg my bread
Before that wi' Salton I'd wear gowd on my head,
Wear gowd on my head, or gowns fring'd to the knee;
And I'll die if I getna my love Auchanachie.

"O Salton's [a] valley lies low by the sea,
He's bowed on the back, and thrawin on the knee;"
.....
.....

"O Salton's a valley lies low by the sea;
Though he's bowed on the back and thrawin on the knee,
Though he's bowed on the back and thrawin on the knee,
The bonny rigs of Salton they're nae thrawin tee"

"O you that are my parents to church may me bring,
But unto Salton I'll never bear a son;
For son or for daughter, I'll ne'er bow my knee,
And I'll die if I getna my love Auchanachie."

When Jeanie was married, from church was brought hame,
When she wi her maidens sae merry shoud hae been,
When she wi her maidens sae merry shoud hae been,
She's called for a chamber, to weep there her lane.

"Come to your bed, Jeanie, my honey and my sweet,
For to stile you mistress I do not think it meet."
"Mistress or Jeanie, it is a' ane to me,
It's in your bed, Salton, I never will be."

Then out spake her father, he spake wi renown;
"Some of you that are her maidens, ye'll loose aff her gown;
Some of you that are her maidens, ye'll loose aff her gown;
And I'll mend the marriage wi' ten thousand crowns."

Then ane of her maidens they loosed aff her gown,
But bonny Jeanie Gordon she fell in a swoon;
She fell in a swoon low down by their knee;
Says, "Look on, I die for my love Auchanachie!"

That very same day Miss Jeanie did die,
And hame came Auchanachie, hame frae the sea;
Her father and mither welcomed him at the gate;
He said, "Where's Miss Jeanie, that she's nae here yet?"

Then forth came her maidens, all wringing their hands,
Saying, "Alas for your staying sae lang frae the land!
Sae lang frae the land, and sae lang on the fleed!
They've wedded your Jeanie, and now she is dead."

"Some of you, her maidens, take me by the hand,
And show me the chamber Miss Jeanie died in;"
He kissed her cold lips, which were colder than stane,
And he died in the chamber that Jeanie died in.

Nic Jones 
Buchan, it's bonny, oh and there lives my love;
My heart it lies on him, it will not remove.
It will not remove for all that I have done,
Oh never will I forget my love Annachie.
For Annachie Gordon, oh he's bonny and he's braw,
He'd entice any woman that ever him saw.
He'd entice any woman and so he has done me,
Oh never will I forget my love Annachie

Down came her father, standing on the floor,
Saying, "Jeanie, you're trying the tricks of a whore.
You care nothing for a man who cares so very much for thee;
You must marry with Lord Saltoun and leave Young Annachie.
For Annachie Gordon he's only but a man
Although he may be pretty but where are all his lands?
Saltoun's lands are broad and his towers they stand high;
You must marry with Lord Saltoun and forget Young Annachie."

"With Annachie Gordon oh I'd beg for my bread
Before that I'd marry Saltoun with gold to my head.
With gold to my head and with gowns fringed to the knee,
Oh I'll die if I don't get my love Annachie.
And you that are my parents, oh to church you may me bring,
Ah but unto Lord Saltoun, oh I'll never bear a son.
Oh, A son or a daughter, oh I'll never bow my knee,
Oh, I'll die if I don't get my love Annachie."

When Jeanie was married and from church she was brought home,
And she and her maidens so merry should have been.
When she and her maidens so merry should have been
Oh, she's gone to a chamber and she's crying all alone.

"Come to bed now Jeanie, oh my honey and my sweet,
For to style you my mistress it would not be meet."
"Oh it's mistress or Jeanie, it's all the same to me,
For it's in your bed, Lord Saltoun, I never shall be."
And up and spoke her father and he's spoken with renown,
"All you who are her maidens won't you loosen off her gown."
But she fell down in a swoon, so low down by their knees,
Saying, "Look on, for I'm dying for my love Annachie."

The day that Jeanie married was the day that Jeanie died
That's the day that young Annachie come rolling from the tide
And down came her maidens and they're wringing of their hands,
Saying, "Woe to you, Annachie, for staying from the sands.
So long from the land and so long upon the flood,
Oh they've married your Jeanie and now she is dead."

"All you that are her maidens, won't you take me by the hand?
Won't you lead me to the chamber that my love lies in?"
And he's kissed her cold lips until his heart turned to stone,
And he's died in the chamber where his true love lay in.

Mary Black 
Harking is bonnie
And there lives my love
My heart lies on him
And will not remove
It will not remove
Oh for all that I have done
Oh I never will forget my love Anachie

For Anachie Gordon
He's bonnie and he's rough
He'd entice any woman that ever he saw
He'd entice any woman and so he has done me
Oh I never will forget my love Anachie

Down came her father and he's standing by the door
Saying Jeannie you're trying the tricks of a whore
You care nothing for a man who cares so very much for thee
You must marry lord Sulton and leave Anachie
For Anachie Gordon, he's barely but a man
Although he may be pretty but where are his lands?
Oh the Sulton's lands are broad and his towers they run high
You must marry lord Sulton and leave Anachie

With Anachie Gordon I'd beg for my bread
And before I'll marry Sulton it's gold to my head
With gold to my head and gowns fringed to the knee
And I'll die if I don't get me love Anachie
And you that are my parents to church you may me bring
But unto lord Sulton I'll never bear a son
To a son or a daughter, I'll never bow my knee
And I'll die if I don't get me love Anachie

Jeannie was married and from church she was brought home
And when she and her maidens so merry should have been
When she and her maidens so merry should have been
She went into her chambers she cried all alone

Come to bed now Jeannie me honey and my sweet
For to style you my mistress it would be so sweet
Be it mistress or Jeannie it's all the same to me
But in your bed lord Sulton I never will lie
And down came her father and he's spoken with renown
Saying you that are her maidens go loosen off her gowns
But she fell down to the floor so close down by his knee
Saying father look I'm dying for me love Anachie

The day that Jeannie married was the day that Jeannie died
And the day that young Anachie came home on the tide
And down came her maidens all wringing off their hands
Saying oh it's been so long you've spent so long on the sands
Oh so long on the sands, so long on the flood
They have married your Jeannie and now she lies dead

You that are her maidens go take me by the hand
And take me to the chamber that me love she lies in
And he's kissed her cold lips till his heart has turned to stone
And he's died in the chamber that his love she lies in

Loreena McKennitt 
Harking is bonny and there lives my love
My love lies on him and cannot remove
It cannot remove for all that I have done
And I never will forget my love Annachie
For Annachie Gordon, he's bonny and he's bright
He'd entice any woman that e'er, e'er he saw
He'd entice any woman and so he has done me
And I never will forget my love Annachie

Down came her father, he's standing at the door
Saying, "Jeannie, you are trying the tricks of a whore
You care nothing for a man who cares so very much for thee
You must marry Lord Sultan and leave Annachie
For Annachie Gordon, he's barely but a man
Although he may be pretty but where are his lands?
For the Sultan's lands are broad and his towers, they run high
You must marry Lord Sultan and leave Annachie"

"With Annachie Gordon I beg for my bread
Before I marry Sultan, his gold to my head
With gold to my head and straight down to my knee
And I'll die if I don't get my love Annachie
And you who are my parents, to church you may me bring
But unto Lord Sultan I'll never bear a son
To a son or a daughter I'll never bow my knee
And I'll die if I don't get my love Annachie"

Jeannie was married, from church was brought home
When she and her maidens so merry should have been
When she and her maidens so merry should have been
She goes into her chamber and cries all alone

"Come to bed, my Jeannie, my honey and my sweet
To stile you my mistress, it would be so sweet"
"Be it mistress or Jeannie, it's all the same to me
But in your bed, Lord Sultan, I never will lie"
And down came her father, he's spoken with renown
Saying, "You who are her maidens, go loosen up her gowns"
And she fell down to the floor and straight down to her knee saying
"Father, look I'm dying for my love Annachie"

The day that Jeannie married was the day that Jeannie died
And the day that young Annachie came home on the tide
And down came her maidens all wringing of their hands
Saying, "Oh it's been so long, you've been so long on the sands
So long on the sands, so long upon the floods
They have married your Jeannie and now she lies dead"

"You who are her maidens, come take me by the hand
And lead me to the chamber where my love, she lies in"
And he kissed her cold lips till his heart, it turned to stone
And he died in the chamber that his love, she lies in

Aunt Molly Jackson 

Archie D was beautiful, and easy on the eye

He tempted all the women, they could not pass him by

He tempted every woman, Just as he tempted me

I’ll die if I don’t get, my love Archie D

Up spake her old father, as he walked by the door

Oh Jean you’re a-playing, the tricks of a whore

You are caring for a man, that cares little for thee

You must marry Bill Shelton, and forget Archie D

To marry Bill Shelton, I’d rather be dead

I’d rather marry my Archie, and beg for my bread

Oh Jean you are foolish, you don’t understand

Bill Shelton has money, and a lot of free land

You’ll have money for yourself Jean, and land and money to give me

But you’ll never have nothing, if you marry Archie D

But I love Archie, and Archie he loves me

I’ll die if I don’t get, my love Archie D

Then up spoke her father, he spake in renown

Saying cheer up my daughter, get on your wedding gown

Go marry Bill Shelton, for ten thousand pounds

Oh cheer up my darling, and get on your wedding gown

Get ready my daughter, and go to town with me

And marry Bill Shelton, And forget this Archie D

I’ll marry no man, but my love Archie D

For I dearly love Archie, and I know he loves me

Yes I dearly love Archie, and I know he loves me

I’ll die if I don’t get, my love Archie D

Jean stepped in her chambers, and closed up her door

Saying farewell dear father, you shall see me no more

Archie may be drownded, in the blue briny sea

I’ll die if I don’t get, my love Archie D

I’m sure I can never, be Archie D’s wife

So I have decided, to end my own life

That evening Young Archie, Come home from the sea

And asked one of his maidens, where Jeannie might be

She has destroyed her life sir, because she loved thee

She destroyed her life, for the love of Archie D

Oh this is a pity, oh this is a sin

Please take me to the chamber, that my darling died in

Then she led him to the chamber, where Jean Gordon lay

He kissed her pale lips, as cold as the clay

Saying I always intended, to make her my wife

Then he kneeled down by the side of her, and ended his own life

It is the lyrics of the traditional version and the three first versions of the modern version. It's easy to see the development of the song through the lyrics. No two versions have exactly the same lyrics.

Almost all Child Ballads were recorded by Ewan MacColl, Peggy Seeger or Burl Ives, but in this case we have one of the rarest Child ballads. On stylistic grounds it has been suggested that most of the recent recordings are based on Nic Jones's version. They use the place-name "Harking" (which doesn't exist) instead of "Buchan" (which does exist, in Aberdeenshire). Mary Black has perhaps mis-heard Nic Jones. There is no known historical basis for the ballad, but the place name Buchan would place it in the north of Scotland.

References

External links 
Traditional Ballad Index
Hannah Le Gordon
Auchanachie

Child Ballads
Mary Black songs
Sinéad O'Connor songs
Scottish folk songs